The following are the records of Singapore in Olympic weightlifting. Records are maintained in each weight class for the snatch lift, clean and jerk lift, and the total for both lifts by the Singapore Weightlifting Federation (SWF).

Men

Women

References
General
Singaporean Records 11 September 2022 updated
Specific

External links
SWF web site

records
Singapore
Olympic weightlifting
weightlifting